Preston is a village and civil parish in Gloucestershire, England, situated 2.2 km south-east of the town of Cirencester. It is administered by the Cotswold District of Gloucestershire. The population of the civil parish at the 2011 Census was 327. Preston was mentioned in the Domesday Book (1086) as Pontune.

References

External links

Villages in Gloucestershire
Civil parishes in Gloucestershire
Cotswold District